The Men's relay competition at the Biathlon World Championships 2021 was held on 20 February 2021.

Results
The race was started at 15:00.

References

Men's relay